Akkuzevo (Aqküź) is a rural locality (a selo) and the administrative centre of Akkuzevsky Selsoviet, Ilishevsky District, Bashkortostan, Russia. The population was 492 as of 2010. There are 8 streets.

Geography 
Akkuzevo is located 24 km northwest of Verkhneyarkeyevo (the district's administrative centre) by road. Kipchakovo is the nearest rural locality.

References 

Rural localities in Ilishevsky District